The International Racquetball Federation's 18th Racquetball World Championships were held in Cali, Colombia, from July 15 to 23, 2016. This was the first time Worlds have been in Colombia, and the first time the event was held in South America since 1998, when Cochabamba, Bolivia, was host.

Mexicans Alvaro Beltran and Javier Moreno won the men's doubles World Championship for the third time as a team, when the defeated Americans Jake Bredenbeck and Jose Diaz in the final, 15-12, 15-9. Previously, the Mexicans had won in 2006 and 2012. Moreno also won the title in 2000 with Luis Bustilos. The Mexicans defeated the defending World Champions, Sebastian Franco and Alejandro Herrera of Colombia, in the semi-finals.

Tournament format
The 2016 World Championships was a two-stage competition. There was an initial group stage played as a round robin with the results used to seed teams for the medal round.

Round robin
Source

Pool A

Pool B

Pool C

Pool D

Elimination round
Source

References

2016 Racquetball World Championships